In the mathematical discipline of graph theory, a subset of vertices in a graph G 
is called dissociation  if it induces a subgraph with maximum degree 1. The number of vertices in a maximum cardinality dissociation set in G is called the dissociation number of G, denoted by diss(G). The problem of computing diss(G) (dissociation number problem) was firstly studied by Yannakakis. The problem is NP-hard even in the class of bipartite and planar graphs.

An algorithm for computing a 4/3-approximation of the dissociation number in bipartite graphs was published in 2022.

The problem asks for the size of a largest subset  of the vertices of a graph , so that the induced subgraph  has maximum degree .

Notes

References 

 
 
 

Graph invariants